Ernest Ian Parsons  (24 October 1912 – 14 August 1940) was a New Zealand born rugby union player, who gained one cap for England (in the 1939 Calcutta Cup match).  During the Second World War he served with the Royal Air Force (No. 10 Squadron RAF), and was awarded the Distinguished Flying Cross.

He was killed in 1940 and is buried in France.

References

1912 births
1940 deaths
British rugby union players
Recipients of the Distinguished Flying Cross (United Kingdom)
Royal Air Force personnel killed in World War II
England international rugby union players
Royal Air Force officers